Cerium hydroxide may refer to:

 Cerium(III) hydroxide, Ce(OH)3, cerium trihydroxide
 Cerium(IV) hydroxide, Ce(OH)4, cerium tetrahydroxide